Samuel Gomes da Mata (born 20 August 1999), commonly known as Samuel, is a Brazilian footballer who plays as a forward for Gudja United FC.

Career statistics

Club

Notes

References

1999 births
Living people
Brazilian footballers
Association football forwards
Goiás Esporte Clube players